The third season of Asia's Got Talent (AGT) premiered on February 7, 2019 at 8:30 pm (UTC+8). The winner of this season received a grand prize of US$100,000.

The show is hosted by Alan Wong and Justin Bratton, both returning from the previous season. David Foster, Anggun, and Jay Park returned as judges for this season.

The show's official sponsor for this season is Princess Cruises.

Taiwanese close-up magician, Eric Chien, was declared as the third season winner, making him the first winner from outside Southeast Asia as well as the first winner from a country with no separate Got Talent franchise.

Auditions

Open auditions
The open auditions for the third season will take place in key cities in Asia. Open auditions will be held in Thailand, Singapore, Philippines, Vietnam, Indonesia, and Malaysia. The open auditions will be judged by Asia's Got Talent producers.

Auditionees are also allowed to submit their audition videos online via the show's official website. Entries will be accepted from May 16 to July 9, 2018. Due to popular demand, the online auditions were extended for another week until July 16, 2018. Those who will pass will proceed to the live judges' auditions.

Judges' auditions

The judges' auditions were taped from September 19 to 27, 2018 at the Pinewood Iskandar Malaysia Studios in Johor, Malaysia like the previous seasons.

The judges' auditions once again feature the Golden Buzzer. Each judge would have one chance to use the Golden Buzzer. The hosts (as one) also get an opportunity to press the golden buzzer. The so-called Golden Acts, those on whom the Golden Buzzer is used, would automatically advance to the semifinals. Jay Park pressed his golden buzzer for the Singaporean digital magician, TK Jiang, on the first episode. Anggun pressed her golden buzzer for the Taiwanese hiphop dance group, Maniac Family, on the second episode. Alan & Justin pressed their golden buzzer for the hand shadow performer, Shadow Ace, from the Philippines, on the third episode. Lastly, David Foster gave his golden buzzer to Eleana Gabunada, a musical singer also from the Philippines, on the fourth episode.

Below are the acts who are confirmed within the show to have received at least two Yes votes and thus had successfully passed their auditions, as well as the Golden Acts. The list does not cover everyone who had passed. Due to time constraints, some acts, named or otherwise, are seen with their fates partially known (only one known Yes vote) or edited out completely from broadcast and are thus not listed.

Semifinals
Like the previous season, the deliberation round was held at the Pinewood Iskandar Malaysia Studios in Johor, Malaysia. It was shown at end of the final auditions episode. Throughout the entire auditions, 99 acts received at least 2 yeses from the judges, including the four golden buzzer acts. Aside from the four acts that received the golden buzzer, the judges chose 20 more acts who would compete in semifinals. The four golden buzzer acts and the judges' picks would bring the total number of semifinalists to 24. The first eight semifinalists were announced after the deliberation round, with the others to be revealed gradually as the semifinal rounds progress.

The semifinal rounds were taped on December 6, 10, and 13, 2018 at the same studio as the judges' auditions.

Just like in the previous season, only online voting methods are available, but the Facebook hashtag voting was dropped. The audience may vote through Facebook Messenger and Google search. A maximum of 10 votes per day, per user, per platform is implemented.

Facebook Messenger
 The viewer must search for Asia's Got Talent on Facebook Messenger. A photo carousel will appear with the pictures of the week's semifinalists. Click the picture to assign 1 to 10 votes for the chosen act.

Google Search
 The user must have a Google account first. The phrase "Asia's Got Talent vote" must be typed on the search box. The photos of the week's acts will appear. Click the photo to choose the act. The slider on the right assigns 1 to 10 votes for that act.

The revelation of results is slightly different, being revealed in the following week rather than the next night (as semifinal rounds are only once weekly, barring replays). The Judges' Pick returns this season. The judges would come to a unanimous decision to send one act straight to the finals. This is similar to the Judges' Choice in the other local franchises, albeit one ahead of the vote rather than after and based on the vote. Aside from the Judges' Pick, the two acts with the most public votes would also advance to the finals. There would be a total of nine finalists emerging from the three semifinal rounds.

Semifinals summary

Semifinals 1 (March 14) 
Voting for this round took place exclusively through Google Search due to technical problems experienced on Facebook services by users in numerous countries several hours before the episode aired.

Semifinals 2 (March 21)

Semifinals 3 (March 28)

Finals
The finals, like the previous season, will be held at the Marina Bay Sands, Singapore, over a span of two episodes, a performance night and a results night.

The winner will receive a grand prize of US$100,000 and one-year complimentary flights from VietJet Air.

The opening production consists of the 9 finalists dancing to "Don't Stop Me Now" by Queen.

David Foster played the piano for Fernando Varela and Pia Toscano, who sang "You Raise Me Up" by Josh Groban and "All by Myself" by Eric Carmen, respectively. Anggun performed a duet with Luciano Pavarotti to "Caruso" in a virtual concert. While Jay Park performed his newest single entitled "K-Town".

Contestants who appeared on previous shows or seasons

References

External links
 Asia's Got Talent official website

Got Talent